Plainsong was originally a British country rock/folk rock band, formed in early 1972 by Ian (later Iain) Matthews, formerly of Fairport Convention and Matthews Southern Comfort, and Andy Roberts, previously of Everyone and The Liverpool Scene. The band's line-up consisted of Matthews, Roberts, piano and bass player Dave Richards (David Latham Richards, born London 7 May 1947; died 16 January 2019) and American guitarist and bass player Bobby Ronga (Robert R. Ronga, born 23 December 1946, New York; died 12 November 2012). Plainsong released just one album during their original existence, In Search of Amelia Earhart, before splitting up at the end of December 1972.

Since the early 1990s, Matthews and Roberts have intermittently performed and recorded together as Plainsong, either as a duo, often as 'Plainsong Light', or with other musicians; Mark Griffiths, Julian Dawson, Clive Gregson. Their most recent performances were as a trio with Mark Griffiths in 2017 at the Cropredy Festival, and as a duo during a short UK tour in August 2021.
They also released a live album under their own names in 2021, recorded at the Bonington Theatre in Nottingham in 1991.

Original band
Matthews had been a member of Fairport Convention between 1967 and 1969, singing vocals on the band's first two albums, the self-titled Fairport Convention and What We Did On Our Holidays, initially singing alongside Judy Dyble and then later Sandy Denny. By the time of the recording of band's third album Unhalfbricking, Fairport, under Denny's influence, had largely abandoned their original American singer-songwriter material and were moving towards what would become known as English folk rock. The genre was somewhat alien to Matthews' tastes leading to a discontent within Fairport that saw him essentially fired from the band after a meeting with producer Joe Boyd in February 1969.

He then left to work solo, soon afterwards forming his own band, Matthews Southern Comfort whose greatest success was topping the UK Singles Chart with their version of Joni Mitchell's "Woodstock" in late October 1970. After that band split up, he recorded two solo albums, If You Saw Thro' My Eyes and Tigers Will Survive in 1971, on both of which Andy Roberts had played guitar. 

Matthews and Roberts formed Plainsong with Richards and Ronga in early 1972, after a meeting at Matthews' Highgate flat in December 1971 where they tried out the song "Along Comes Mary" and agreed that if it worked they would go ahead and form a band. The band's name was picked on a whim when they randomly opened a copy of The Concise Oxford Dictionary of Music to find Plainsong at pages 450-451. 

After a month of rehearsals at a studio in London called The Cabin, Plainsong began their first UK tour at the end of January 1972, beginning at Leeds University on 29 January 1972 and ending at The Roundhouse in London on 19 March; they then embarked on a 10-date tour of Holland on 24 March. The band signed to Elektra Records and recorded their debut album, In Search of Amelia Earhart, which was released on 6 October 1972.  The album mixed songs by both Matthews and Roberts with several covers, including versions of 'Red River Dave' McEnery's song "Amelia Earhart's Last Flight", Paul Siebel's "Louise" and Jerry Yester and Judy Henske's "Raider". The album also included "True Story Of Amelia Earhart's Last Flight", a Matthews song based on research that suggests that Amelia Earhart on her round-the-world flight in 1937 may have been spying on Japanese bases in the Pacific islands; and "Even the Guiding Light", a response to Richard Thompson's "Meet on the Ledge".

In Search Of Amelia Earhart was critically well-received on its release - Record Mirror called it "The Contemporary Folk Record of the Year"; and rock journalist Charles Shaar Murray, reviewing the album in New Musical Express, described it as “one of the classic albums of 1972” - but despite the acclaim it did not sell in particularly big numbers and was thus not a commercial success. The group toured extensively throughout 1972 (with the addition of drummer Roger Swallow) and began recording a second album, initially titled Plainsong III to reflect the fact that they were by now a trio, Ronga having left the band due to a drinking problem. However, Matthews and Richards disagreed on the direction the album should take, and the band broke up in December 1972. With no band to promote the album, Plainsong III remained unreleased and Matthews and Roberts moved on to begin recording again as solo artists. Several tracks from that intended album subsequently appeared on their solo albums.   

In Search of Amelia Earhart in its original form was unavailable on CD for many years, being issued as a Japanese-only CD by Warner-Elektra in 1991 and then reissued by Matthews' own label Perfect Pitch in 2001, and more recently by Man In The Moon Records in 2016. The unissued Plainsong III, since renamed Now We Are 3, finally saw the light of day in 2005 as the second disc of a 2CD re-issue by Water Records just entitled Plainsong, where both Plainsong albums featured along with radio recordings, demos and singles, including "Along Comes Mary".

Three albums of archive recordings by Plainsong have also been released on CD since the 1990s, including And That's That - The Demos, comprising recordings made for the band's unreleased second album, and two versions of On Air containing tracks recorded at the BBC studios in several sessions throughout 1972. Plainsong also recorded two television sessions for the BBC2 music programme The Old Grey Whistle Test, appearing on 7 March and 17 October respectively. Introduced by presenter Bob Harris, Plainsong's performance of "Even The Guiding Light" from the October OGWT show  can be viewed on YouTube.

Revival
In 1991, some eighteen years after the original band broke up, Roberts encountered Matthews again when he was performing in a pub in Brighton, and the two decided to revive Plainsong.  Adding Mark Griffiths and Julian Dawson, they reformed the band in 1992 and recorded three albums - Dark Side of the Room (1992), Voices Electric (1994), and Sister Flute (1996) - before Dawson left to pursue a solo career.  His replacement was Clive Gregson, once of Any Trouble and later Gregson & Collister.  The new line-up then recorded New Place Now in 1999, before Matthews and Roberts recorded a 6-track mini-album in 2001, A To B, as a duo under the Plainsong name. For the next Plainsong album, Pangolins in 2003, Dawson rejoined the band replacing Gregson.  

In its various line-ups, Plainsong performed and toured throughout the 1990s and 2000s. What was planned to be their final album, Fat Lady Singing (recorded live in the studio during their last tour in 2004) was released in 2012, that year marking the 40th anniversary of the formation of the band. Plainsong promoted the album by undertaking a 40th Anniversary Farewell tour of Europe covering Germany, Austria, Holland, Denmark and the UK before disbanding as a quartet. Their performance at Norderstedt in Germany on 4 September 2012 was recorded live and broadcast on NDR Radio. The 'final tour' culminated with two dates in Japan in October 2012.

However, final album and tour it turned out not to be. In 2014, Matthews and Roberts decided to record some of the songs of Richard Fariña, to mark the approaching 50th anniversary of his death. With Mark Griffiths back on board playing guitar and bass, the decision to use the Plainsong name made sense, and the group was again re-activated. The album Reinventing Richard: The Songs Of Richard Fariña was released in 2015. In July 2016, the trio played a handful of UK shows to promote the album, beginning at Whitstable in Kent, with US and European dates following later in September and October. 

The same Plainsong line-up came back together again for the Cropredy Festival in August 2017, celebrating Fairport Convention's 50th anniversary. The reformed band played a 12-song set featuring mostly songs from the Reinventing Richard and Amelia Earhart albums. Iain Matthews also rejoined Fairport Convention later that evening during their headlining set, singing vocals on several songs including "Reno Nevada" and "Meet On The Ledge". The concert was later released as the Fairport Convention 2CD What We Did On Our Saturday.

Nearly fifty years on from the formation of the band, Matthews and Roberts revived Plainsong yet again in 2021, playing a short tour of the UK including gigs at two of their favourite music venues, The Greys in Brighton and the Half Moon in Putney. Like their Cropredy performance in 2017, their set list featured several Richard Fariña songs plus cuts from the Amelia Earhart album.

Discography

Original line-up
 In Search of Amelia Earhart (1972 vinyl) UK and US Elektra Records
 First issued on CD in Japan, 1991, Elektra / Warner-Pioneer Corporation
 Reissued on CD, 2001, Perfect Pitch
 Reissued on CD, 2016, Man In The Moon
 On Air - Original BBC Recordings (recorded 1972, released 1992, Band Of Joy Records)
 Plainsong On Air (expanded version with two extra tracks released 1997, Strange Fruit Records)
 And That's That - The Demos (recorded 1972, released 1992, Taxim Records)
 Plainsong 2CD (2005) Water Records
 CD1 features In Search Of Amelia Earhart, plus seven tracks of radio sessions and one demo
 CD2 features Now We Are 3 (previously unreleased second album), plus seven live tracks and two singles

Revival
 Dark Side Of The Room (1992) Line Records
 Voices Electric (1994) Line Records
 Sister Flute (1996) Line Records
 New Place Now (1999) Spinalong Records UK / Blue Rose Records Europe 
 Live In Austria (1999) Plainsong (Four-track mini-CD, live in Thalgäu)
 A To B (2001) Spinalong Records (Six-track mini-CD) 
 Pangolins (2003) Blue Rose Records
 Fat Lady Singing (2012) Blue Rose Records
 Reinventing Richard: The Songs Of Richard Fariña (2015) Fledg’ling Records

Blue Rose Records compilations
Plainsong tracks appear on various Blue Rose compilation CDs:
 Blue Rose Collection Vol.6 (1999)  : Plainsong "Following Amelia"
 Blue Rose Collection Vol.10 (2003)  : Plainsong "Barbed Wire Fence"
 Blue Rose Nuggets 3 (2003)   : Plainsong "Needle In The Hay".
 Blue Rose Nuggets 11 (2005)  : Plainsong "Even The Guiding Light" recorded live at the Hospitalkirche in Schwäbisch Hall, Germany, 8 May 2003 
 Blue Rose Nuggets 27 (2007)   : Plainsong "Footsteps Fall".
 Blue Rose Nuggets 46 (2010)   : Plainsong "Here Comes The Rain".
 Blue Rose Nuggets 57 (2012)   : Plainsong "Sloth".
 Various Artists – 20 Years Blue Rose Records – Best Of Americana Rock Music Vol. 2 Past and Present (2CD) (2015) :
 Plainsong "Barbed Wire Fence"
 Blue Rose Nuggets 95 (2019)   : Plainsong "I Can't Let Go".

Other compilation albums
Plainsong tracks can also be found on two compilation albums released under Iain Matthews' name.
 The Soul Of Many Places - The Elektra Years 1972-1974 (1993) Elektra Records
 Orphans And Outcasts (2019) Cherry Red Records
 4CD box set containing remastered versions of Orphans And Outcasts Volumes 1-3, plus a fourth CD of newly-curated outtakes and demo recordings.
 Newest Overview *** 6CD boxset - Following Amelia: The 1972 Recordings & More Box Set [Lemon Records UK] Amazon.com

Plainsong tracks from both the original band and the revival bands can also be found on numerous other compilation albums. A listing can be found on the Discogs website.

Notes

References

English folk rock groups
Musical groups established in 1972
English country music groups
Elektra Records artists
British country rock musical groups
Ruf Records artists
Strange Fruit Records artists

Recommended reading

 Ian Clayton: In Search Of Plainsong, Route Publishing, 2022; 
 Iain Matthews with Ian Clayton: Thro' My Eyes: A Memoir, Route Publishing, 2018;